Puolanka (also ) is a municipality in Finland located in the Kainuu region. The municipality has a population of 
which 
is water. The population density is
.

The municipality is unilingually Finnish.

History 
The first permanent settlers in Puolanka came in the 1550s.

The municipality of Puolanka was established in the year of 1867. In that same year the Puolanka parish became independent from the Hyrynsalmi church to which it had previously belonged to administratively. The municipal council of Puolanka was formed in the year of 1916.

At its peak Puolanka had a population of about 7,520 in 1960. Towards the end of the 1960s, however, Puolanka's population began to decline, alike other municipalities within Kainuu.

Geography

Villages 
Villages within Puolanka are as follows:

 Aittokylä
 Auho
 Joukokylä
 Kivarinjärvi
 Kotila
 Kongasmäki
 Leipivaara
 Lylykylä
 Naulaperä
 Puokio
 Puolanka
 Rasinkylä
 Suolijärvi
 Vihajärvi
 Väyrylä
 Yli-Oterma
 Törmänmäki

Notable individuals 
 Juha Sipilä, the Prime Minister of Finland 2015−2019
 Kalle Määttä, volleyball player
 Kaarina Mähönen, poet
 Kari Hiltunen, sports journalist
 Kimmo Saneri, writer
 Lasse Väisänen, footballer
 Louis Moilanen, giant
 Markku Kukkoaho, sprinter
 Santeri Haapanen, politician
 Tauno Tarkkinen, writer
 Tuulikki Pyykkönen, Olympic cross-country skier
 Unto Väisänen, baseball player

Gallery

References

External links

 Official website of Puolanka municipality

 
Municipalities of Kainuu